Parotis athysanota is a moth in the family Crambidae. It was described by George Hampson in 1912. It is found in India's Nilgiri Mountains and in New Guinea and Taiwan.

References

Moths described in 1912
Spilomelinae